The white-throated canary (Crithagra albogularis) is a species of finch in the family Fringillidae.

Taxonomy
The white-throated canary was formerly placed in the genus Serinus but phylogenetic analysis using mitochondrial and nuclear DNA sequences found that the genus was polyphyletic. The genus was therefore split and a number of species including the white-throated canary were moved to the resurrected genus Crithagra.

Description
The white-throated canary is a small bird about 15 cm long with generally dull-coloured plumage and a yellow or yellow-green rump. It has a heavy horn-coloured beak and brown irises. Its legs are brown. The male and female have similar external appearances, and juveniles resemble adults.

Distribution and habitat
It is found in Angola, Botswana, Lesotho, Namibia, and South Africa. Its natural habitats are subtropical or tropical dry shrubland and subtropical or tropical high-altitude grassland.

References

External links 

 White-throated canary - Species text in The Atlas of Southern African Birds.

white-throated canary
Birds of Southern Africa
white-throated canary
Taxonomy articles created by Polbot